The chapters of Earl Cain are written and illustrated by Kaori Yuki. The manga debuted in the December 1991 issue of the Japanese manga magazine Bessatsu Hana to Yume, and it was eventually transferred to Hana to Yume, where it ran until the seventeenth issue. The chapters of Forgotten Juliet, The Sound of a Boy Hatching, Kafka, and The Seal of the Red Ram were published in five tankōbon volumes by Hakusensha from July 17, 1992, to October 1994. The chapters of the sequel series, Godchild, ran in Hana to Yume from 2001 to 2004, and were published in eight volumes by Hakusensha from November 19, 2001, to January 19, 2004. Together, the series spans 13 volumes. Hakusensha later published chapters from Forgotten Juliet, The Sound of a Boy Hatching, Kafka, and The Seal of the Red Ram in two volumes from December 20, 2004, to January 28, 2005. Hakusensha re-released the series in bunkoban format from July 15, 2009, to March 16, 2010. Set in 19th-century England, the series focuses on a young earl named Cain Hargreaves who solves murders while encountering his father's secret organization, which experiments with reviving the dead.

Earl Cain is licensed for English-language release in North America by Viz Media, which published Forgotten Juliet, The Sound of a Boy Hatching, Kafka, and The Seal of the Red Ram as The Cain Saga and a prequel to Godchild. Viz published The Cain Saga from October 3, 2006, to June 5, 2007. Godchild was released simultaneously from March 7, 2006, to February 5, 2008, as well as being serialized in Viz's Shojo Beat anthology from July 2005 to June 2006. Earl Cain is also licensed in Taiwan by Tong Li Comics, in Germany by Carlsen Comics, in Italy by Planet Manga, in Sweden by Bonnier Carlsen, in Spain by Glénat, and in France by Editions Tonkam.

Volume list

Godchild

Notes

References

Earl Cain